Michael Brini Ferri (born 18 July 1989) is an Italian footballer who plays for Viareggio.

Biography
Born in Ferrara, Emilia–Romagna, Brini Ferri started his career at Sassuolo. In 2009, he left for Viareggio in co-ownership deal along with Andrea Briotti. In June 2010 Sassuolo gave up the remain 50% registration rights to Viareggio. After no appearance in the first half of 2010–11 Lega Pro Prima Divisione, Brini Ferri joined Serie D (non-professional/regional) team Camaiore on free transfer. On 23 June he returned to Viareggio.

References

External links
 Viareggio 2009–10 Profile 
 Football.it Profile 
 
 LaSerieD.com Profile 

Italian footballers
U.S. Sassuolo Calcio players
F.C. Esperia Viareggio players
Association football midfielders
Sportspeople from Ferrara
1989 births
Living people
Footballers from Emilia-Romagna